The following is a list of clubs who have played in the English Football  League One at any time since its formation in 2004 to the current season. EFL League One teams playing in the 2022–23 season are indicated in bold. If the longest spell is the current spell, this is indicated in bold, and if the highest finish is that of the most recent season, this is also in bold. Teams in italic no longer exist in the legal form they competed as in League One. A total of 75 teams have played in League One.

All statistics here refer to time in EFL League One only, with the exception of 'Most recent finish' which refers to all levels of play, and 'Last promotion' which refers to the club's last promotion from the fourth tier of English football.

Overview of clubs by season

Notes

Clubs
EFL League One clubs